Kokocinski is a surname. Notable people with the surname include:

Alessandro Kokocinski (1948–2017), Italian-Argentine painter, sculptor, and set designer of Polish-Russian origin
Licia Kokocinski (born 1951), Australian politician
Michael Kokocinski (born 1985), German footballer